The following is an episode list for the Nickelodeon animated television series Dora and Friends: Into the City! The show debuted on August 18, 2014 and ended on February 5, 2017. It aired on Nickelodeon as part of its weekday morning preschool block.

On October 9, 2014, Nickelodeon renewed the series for a 20-episode second and final season, which aired from September 10, 2015 until February 5, 2017.

Series overview

Episodes

Pilot (2011)

Season 1 (2014–2016)

Season 2 (2015–2017)

Notes

See also
List of Dora the Explorer episodes
List of Dora the Explorer home media releases
Dora the Explorer
Dora and Friends: Into the City!
Go, Diego, Go!

References

Dora and Friends
Dora and Friends